= House of Gusiatnikovs =

- Дом Гусятниковых
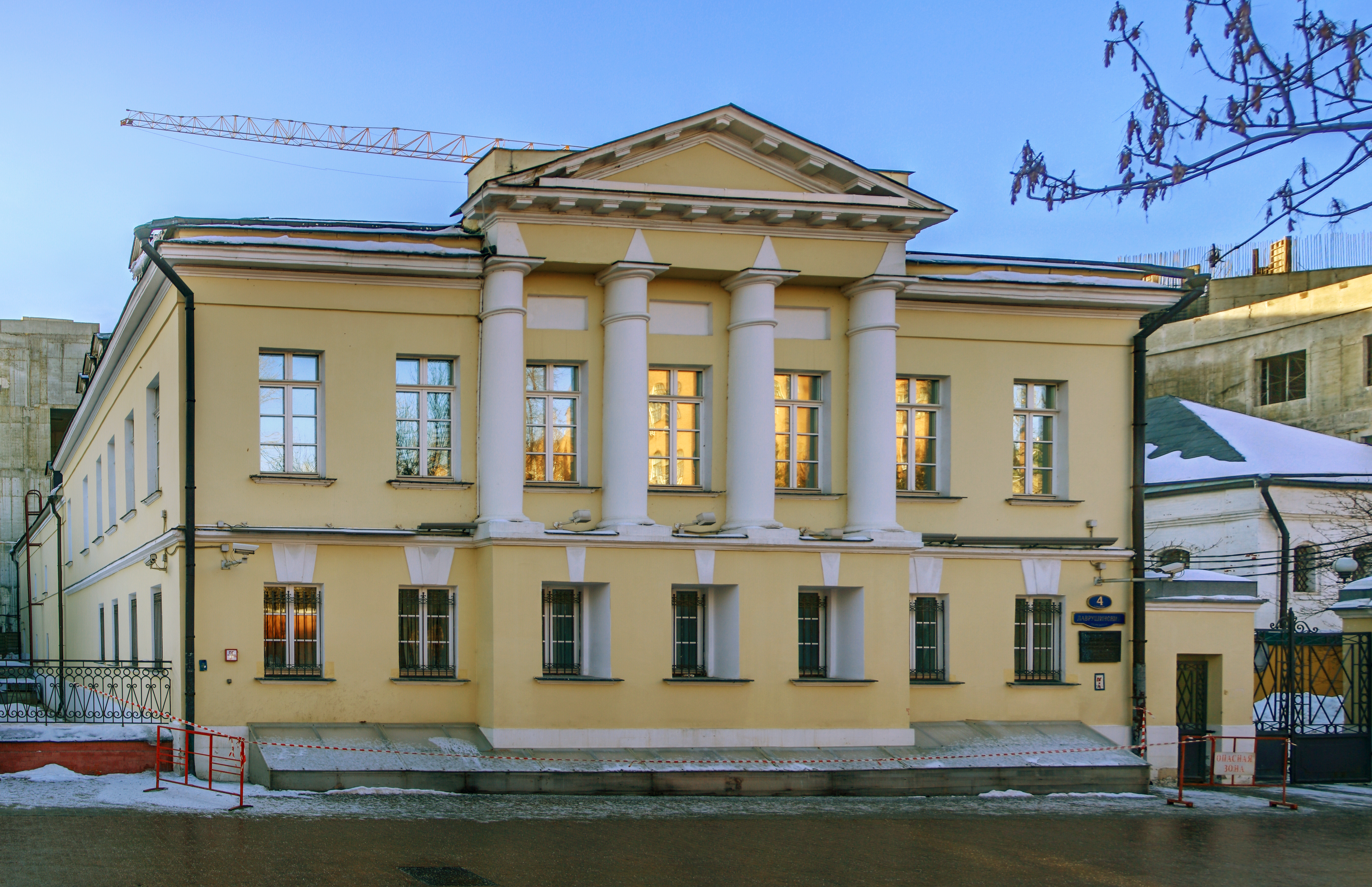
- 55°44′35″N 37°37′12″E
- Location: Moscow, Lavrushinsky perelok, house 4, building 1

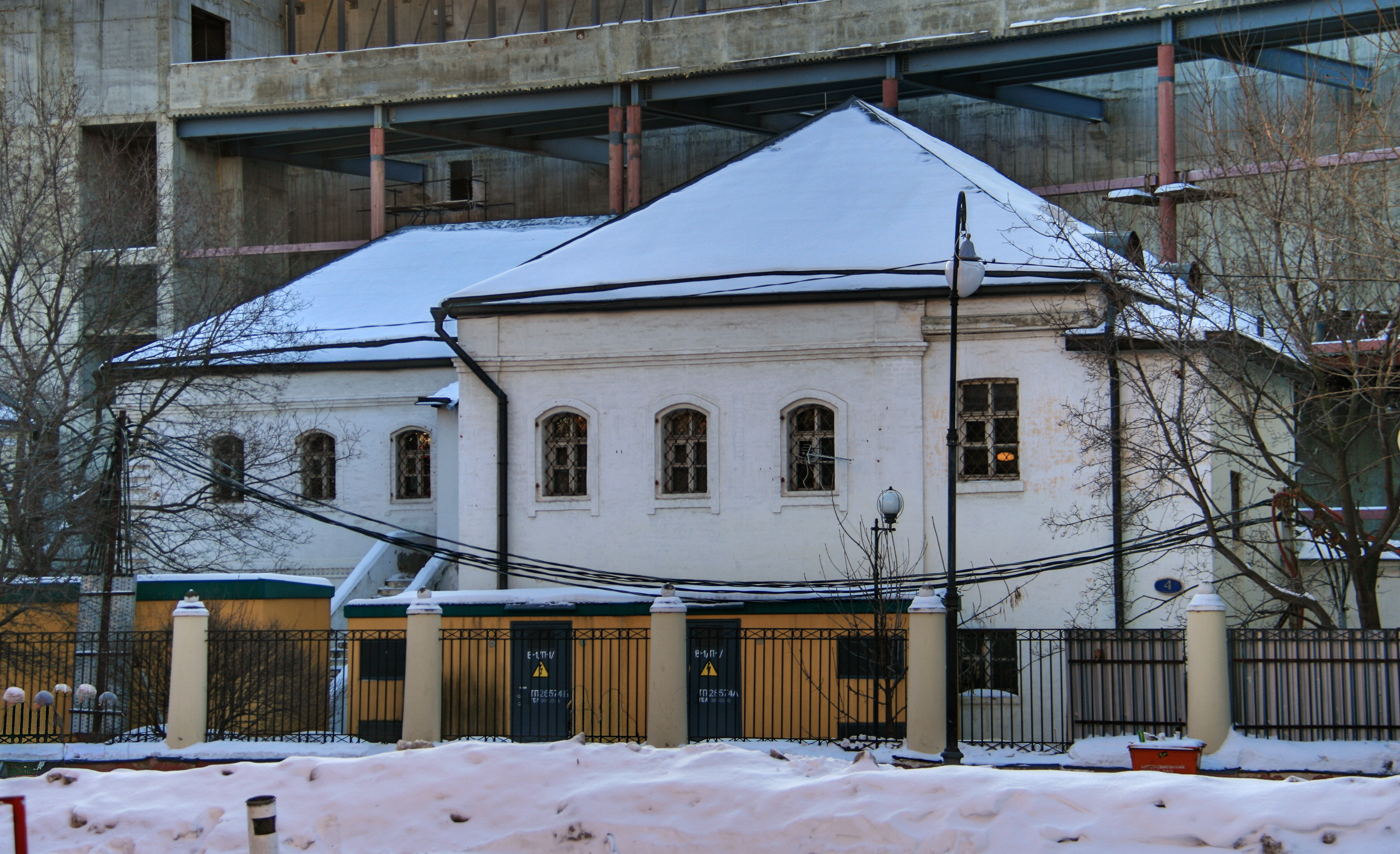
Chambers of the 17th century

The House of Gusiatnikovs (Russian: Дом Гусятниковых) is a mansion of the beginning of the 19th century in the center of Moscow (Lavrushinsky perelok, house 4, building 1). In the courtyard of the house there are chambers of the 17th century (house 4, building 4). The House of Gusiatnikovs and the Chambers have the status of objects of cultural heritage of federal significance. At the present time the building is occupied by the Tretyakov Gallery.

== History and description ==
In the 1630s, on the site of the current buildings was the sloboda farmstead of the weaver Fedor Gusiatnikov.

In the backyard of the courtyard are the 17th century chambers. A wealthy posad chamber was built, presumably after the Streltsi riots, around the 1680s-1690s. At the heart of the building are two chambers, separated by the passage. In the second half of the 18th century, the wards belonged to the merchants of the first guild Andronov engaged in wine trade. With them, the chambers were considerably rebuilt and expanded, having acquired a L-shaped plan in shape. At present, the original decor of the facades of the chambers is lost and covered with plaster, the basement floor is almost hidden under the ground.

At the beginning of the 19th century the estate belonged to the state councilor F. S. Golubtsov, who sold it to his wife Savelyeva. In 1822, on the territory of the manor along the red line of Lavrushinsky lane, a small two-storeyed mansion in the Empire style was built. The middle part of the mansion is marked with a risalite with a Tuscan portico on the second floor, consisting of four pot-bellied half-columns. Thick rims on the half-columns are shifted downward from the canon's place (next to the echinus). Originally the courtyard facade was decorated with lateral rezalitas. In 1832, a two-storey extension was made to one of them. After the reconstruction of the beginning of the 21st century, windows were broken in the basement floor, and the capitals of the semi-columns were distorted.
